The 1899 Illinois Fighting Illini football team was an American football team that represented the University of Illinois during the 1899 college football season.  In their fifth season under head coach George Huff, the Illini compiled a 3–5–1 record and finished in a tie for last place in the Western Conference. Center E. C. McLane was the team captain.

Schedule

Roster

References

Illinois
Illinois Fighting Illini football seasons
Illinois Fighting Illini football